Robert Weeks may refer to:

 Robert Doughty Weeks (1795–1854), American banker
 Robert Kelley Weeks (1840–1876), American poet